The 1870 Delaware gubernatorial election was held on November 8, 1870. Incumbent Democratic Governor Gove Saulsbury was unable to seek re-election. Former State Senator James Ponder ran as the Democratic candidate to succeed Saulsbury and faced Republican nominee Thomas B. Coursey. As Black Delawareans gained the right to vote, Republicans were confident about their chances, and the Democratic Party responded by presenting itself as the "white man's party." Ponder ultimately defeated Coursey by a wide margin, in part because of low Black turnout and a racist backlash against Black suffrage.

General election

Results

References

Bibliography
 
 
 
 Delaware House Journal, 73rd General Assembly, 1st Reg. Sess. (1871).

1870
Delaware
Gubernatorial